Mi Secreto de Amor is the  twentieth Studio album released by Lucero on 6 December 2011.

Track listing

References

2011 albums
Lucero (entertainer) albums
Spanish-language albums